Yaylacılar is a village in the Fındıklı District, Rize Province, in Black Sea Region of Turkey. Its population is 115 (2021).

History 
According to list of villages in Laz language book (2009), name of the village is Xemshilati, which means "Hemshin village" in Laz language. Most villagers are ethnically Hemshin.

Geography

References

Villages in Fındıklı District